The 27th Chess Olympiad (uwlimbiad al-shatranj al-27), organized by FIDE and comprising an open and a women's tournament, as well as several other events designed to promote the game of chess, took place between November 14 and December 2, 1986, in Dubai, United Arab Emirates.

Once again, the Olympiad was marred by politics. With the event being held in an Arab nation, Israel couldn't participate, being in an official state of war with several Arab countries. In protest, Western European nations like Denmark, Norway, Sweden, and the Netherlands didn't come to Dubai. Strong individual players like Viktor Korchnoi, Robert Hübner, and Eric Lobron also stayed away.

With no championship match in progress at the time, the Soviet Union was again able to field the strongest possible team, led by reigning world champion Kasparov and ex-champion Karpov. Even so, they only finished half a point ahead of England, and they only managed to capture the top spot in the last round. The United States, who had led the table after the penultimate round, had to settle for the bronze medals.

Open event

For the first time, the number of participants reached triple digits. 108 teams from 107 different nations played a 14-round Swiss system tournament. In the event of a draw, the tie-break was decided first by using the Buchholz system, then by match points.

{| class="wikitable"
|+ Open event
! # !! Country !! Players !! Averagerating !! Points
|-
| style="background:gold;"|1 ||  || Kasparov, Karpov, Sokolov, Yusupov, Vaganian, Tseshkovsky || 2681 || 40
|-
| style="background:silver;"|2 ||  || Miles, Nunn, Short, Chandler, Speelman, Flear || 2585 || 39½
|-
| style="background:#cc9966;"|3 ||  || Seirawan, Christiansen, Kavalek, Fedorowicz, De Firmian, Dlugy || 2555 || 38½
|}
{| class="wikitable collapsible collapsed"
! # !! Country !! Averagerating !! Points !! Buchholz !! MP
|-
| 4 ||  || 2584 || 34½ ||  || 
|-
| 5 ||  || 2526 || 34 || 466.0 || 
|-
| 6 ||  || 2479 || 34 || 465.0 || 
|-
| 7 ||  || 2448 || 34 || 432.5 || 
|-
| 8 ||  || 2523 || 33 || 456.5 || 
|-
| 9 ||  || 2510 || 33 || 452.0 || 
|-
| 10 ||  || 2499 || 33 || 443.5 || 
|-
| 11 ||  || 2501 || 33 || 443.0 || 
|-
| 12 ||  || 2380 || 33 || 426.5 || 
|-
| 13 ||  || 2473 || 32½ || 436.0 || 
|-
| 14 ||  || 2394 || 32½ || 421.0 || 
|-
| 15 ||  || 2580 || 32 || 466.5 || 
|-
| 16 ||  || 2445 || 32 || 446.0 || 
|-
| 17 ||  || 2385 || 32 || 420.0 || 
|-
| 18 ||  || 2525 || 31½ || 466.5 || 
|-
| 19 ||  || 2418 || 31½ || 445.5 || 
|-
| 20 ||  || 2433 || 31½ || 444.0 || 
|-
| 21 ||  || 2451 || 31½ || 443.0 || 
|-
| 22 ||  || 2395 || 31½ || 432.0 || 
|-
| 23 ||  || 2406 || 31½ || 420.0 || 
|-
| 24 ||  || 2460 || 31 || 462.5 || 
|-
| 25 ||  || 2389 || 31 || 413.5 || 
|-
| 26 ||  || 2389 || 31 || 411.0 || 
|-
| 27 ||  || 2413 || 30½ || 434.0 || 
|-
| 28 ||  || 2348 || 30½ || 424.0 || 
|-
| 29 ||  || 2413 || 30½ || 423.0 || 
|-
| 30 ||  || 2355 || 30½ || 403.5 || 
|-
| 31 ||  || 2419 || 30 || 426.5 || 
|-
| 32 ||  || 2319 || 30 || 415.5 || 
|-
| 33 ||  || 2281 || 30 || 413.5 || 17
|-
| 34 ||  || 2415 || 30 || 413.5 || 15
|-
| 35 ||  || 2403 || 30 || 405.5 || 
|-
| 36 ||  || 2280 || 30 || 399.5 || 
|-
| 37 ||  || 2321 || 30 || 396.5 || 
|-
| 38 ||  || 2214 || 30 || 393.5 || 
|-
| 39 ||  || 2344 || 29½ || 425.5 || 
|-
| 40 ||  || 2269 || 29½ || 419.0 || 
|-
| 41 ||  || 2316 || 29½ || 409.5 || 
|-
| 42 ||  || 2271 || 29½ || 385.0 || 
|-
| 43 ||  || 2323 || 29 || 420.5 || 
|-
| 44 ||  || 2264 || 29 || 412.5 || 
|-
| 45 ||  || 2293 || 29 || 409.0 || 
|-
| 46 ||  || 2290 || 29 || 408.0 || 
|-
| 47 ||  || 2243 || 29 || 404.0 || 
|-
| 48 ||  || 2315 || 29 || 402.0 || 
|-
| 49 ||  || 2239 || 29 || 391.0 || 
|-
| 50 ||  || 2254 || 28½ || 403.0 || 
|-
| 51 ||  || 2314 || 28½ || 401.0 || 
|-
| 52 ||  || 2255 || 28½ || 399.0 || 
|-
| 53 ||  || 2264 || 28½ || 397.5 || 
|-
| 54 ||  || 2233 || 28½ || 391.5 || 
|-
| 55 ||  || 2239 || 28 || 389.5 || 
|-
| 56 ||  || 2251 || 28 || 388.5 || 
|-
| 57 ||  || 2215 || 28 || 373.5 || 
|-
| 58 ||  || 2306 || 27½ || 417.0 || 
|-
| 59 ||  || 2234 || 27½ || 394.5 || 
|-
| 60 ||  || 2213 || 27½ || 388.5 || 
|-
| 61 ||  || 2200 || 27½ || 381.5 || 
|-
| 62 ||  || 2201 || 27½ || 374.0 || 
|-
| 63 ||  || 2200 || 27½ || 373.5 || 
|-
| 64 ||  || 2200 || 27½ || 361.5 || 
|-
| 65 ||  || 2266 || 27 || 400.5 || 
|-
| 66 ||  || 2201 || 27 || 383.0 || 
|-
| 67 ||  and  || 2218 || 27 || 377.0 || 
|-
| 68 ||  || 2200 || 27 || 374.0 || 
|-
| 69 ||  || 2240 || 27 || 373.0 || 
|-
| 70 ||  || 2200 || 27 || 372.5 || 
|-
| 71 ||  || 2203 || 26½ || 394.5 || 
|-
| 72 ||  || 2221 || 26½ || 384.0 || 
|-
| 73 ||  || 2200 || 26½ || 364.0 || 
|-
| 74 ||  || 2200 || 26½ || 362.5 || 
|-
| 75 ||  || 2200 || 26½ || 353.0 || 
|-
| 76 ||  || 2280 || 26 || 402.5 || 
|-
| 77 ||  || 2203 || 26 || 394.0 || 
|-
| 78 ||  || 2206 || 26 || 387.0 || 
|-
| 79 ||  || 2203 || 26 || 367.5 || 
|-
| 80 ||  || 2200 || 26 || 334.5 || 
|-
| 81 ||  || 2200 || 26 || 329.5 || 
|-
| 82 ||  || 2200 || 26 || 321.0 || 
|-
| 83 ||  "B" || 2201 || 25½ || 372.0 || 
|-
| 84 ||  || 2201 || 25½ || 354.5 || 
|-
| 85 ||  || 2201 || 25½ || 351.5 || 
|-
| 86 ||  || 2200 || 25 || 366.5 || 
|-
| 87 ||  || 2200 || 25 || 363.0 || 
|-
| 88 ||  || 2200 || 25 || 330.5 || 
|-
| 89 ||  || 2200 || 24½ || 379.5 || 
|-
| 90 ||  || 2200 || 24½ || 367.0 || 
|-
| 91 ||  || 2200 || 24½ || 360.0 || 
|-
| 92 ||  || 2203 || 24 || 372.0 || 
|-
| 93 ||  || 2211 || 24 || 365.0 || 
|-
| 94 ||  || 2200 || 24 || 347.0 || 
|-
| 95 ||  || 2200 || 24 || 336.5 || 
|-
| 96 ||  || 2200 || 24 || 310.0 || 
|-
| 97 ||  || 2200 || 23½ || 336.5 || 
|-
| 98 ||  || 2200 || 23½ || 324.5 || 
|-
| 99 ||  || 2200 || 23 || 346.0 || 
|-
| 100 ||  || 2200 || 23 || 332.0 || 
|-
| 101 ||  || 2204 || 23 || 308.5 || 
|-
| 102 ||  || 2201 || 22 || 328.5 || 
|-
| 103 ||  || 2200 || 22 || 307.5 || 
|-
| 104 ||  || 2200 || 20 || 312.5 || 
|-
| 105 ||  || 2200 || 20 || 300.5 || 
|-
| 106 ||  || 2200 || 18½ ||  || 
|-
| 107 ||  || 2200 || 14½ ||  || 
|-
| 108 ||  || 2200 || 5 ||  || 
|}

Individual medals

 Performance rating:  Garry Kasparov 2746
 Board 1:  Garry Kasparov 8½ / 11 = 77.3%
 Board 2:  Imed Abdelnabbi 9½ / 12 = 79.2%
 Board 3:  Nigel Short 10 / 13 = 76.9%
 Board 4:  Artur Yusupov 10 / 12 = 83.3%
 1st reserve:  Luís Muñiz 6 / 7 = 85.7%
 2nd reserve:  Ng Ek Teong 6 / 7 = 85.7%

Women's event

A total of 49 nations took part. In the event of a draw, the tie-break was decided first by using the Buchholz system, then by match points.

Like the open event, the women's tournament was dominated by the Soviet Union, captained by world champion Chiburdanidze, who won the gold medals by a comfortable margin. Hungary and Romania took silver and bronze, respectively.

The real star of the women's event, though, was 45-year-old ex-world champion Gaprindashvili, who won all of her 10 games and finished with an uncanny performance rating of 2877 – more than 100 points better than the best male.

{| class="wikitable"
! # !! Country !! Players !! Averagerating !! Points !! Buchholz
|-
| style="background:gold;"|1 ||  || Chiburdanidze, Akhmilovskaya, Gaprindashvili, Alexandria || 2358 || 33½ || 
|-
| style="background:silver;"|2 ||  || Verőci-Petronić, Mádl, Ivánka, Grosch || 2247 || 29 || 
|-
| style="background:#cc9966;"|3 ||  || Mureșan, Nuțu, Polihroniade, Stanciu-Olărașu || 2178 || 28 || 343.5
|}
{| class="wikitable collapsible collapsed"
! # !! Country !! Averagerating !! Points !! Buchholz
|-
| 4 ||  || 2133 || 28 || 342.0
|-
| 5 ||  || 2190 || 25½ || 
|-
| 6 ||  || 2153 || 25 || 
|-
| 7 ||  || 2237 || 24½ || 350.0
|-
| 8 ||  || 2222 || 24½ || 344.0
|-
| 9 ||  || 2148 || 23½ || 
|-
| 10 ||  || 2063 || 23 || 
|-
| 11 ||  || 2005 || 22½ || 303.0
|-
| 12 ||  || 1967 || 22½ || 288.0
|-
| 13 ||  || 1903 || 22½ || 287.5
|-
| 14 ||  || 2087 || 22 || 339.5
|-
| 15 ||  || 2067 || 22 || 327.5
|-
| 16 ||  || 2055 || 22 || 318.0
|-
| 17 ||  || 1903 || 22 || 306.5
|-
| 18 ||  || 1977 || 21½ || 324.5
|-
| 19 ||  || 2083 || 21½ || 311.5
|-
| 20 ||  || 1928 || 21½ || 305.0
|-
| 21 ||  || 1988 || 21½ || 291.5
|-
| 22 ||  || 1900 || 21½ || 235.5
|-
| 23 ||  || 2055 || 21 || 313.5
|-
| 24 ||  || 1907 || 21 || 308.5
|-
| 25 ||  || 1925 || 21 || 302.0
|-
| 26 ||  || 1912 || 21 || 299.5
|-
| 27 ||  || 1902 || 21 || 291.0
|-
| 28 ||  || 1900 || 21 || 287.0
|-
| 29 ||  || 1913 || 20½ || 309.5
|-
| 30 ||  || 1900 || 20½ || 301.5
|-
| 31 ||  || 1902 || 20½ || 294.5
|-
| 32 ||  || 1960 || 20½ || 286.0
|-
| 33 ||  || 1933 || 20½ || 278.0
|-
| 34 ||  || 1900 || 20½ || 228.5
|-
| 35 ||  || 1900 || 20 || 263.0
|-
| 36 ||  || 1900 || 20 || 246.5
|-
| 37 ||  || 1900 || 20 || 221.5
|-
| 38 ||  || 1900 || 20 || 218.0
|-
| 39 ||  || 1903 || 19½ || 289.0
|-
| 40 ||  || 1900 || 19½ || 263.0
|-
| 41 ||  || 1902 || 19½ || 255.5
|-
| 42 ||  || 1902 || 19½ || 251.0
|-
| 43 ||  || 1900 || 19½ || 229.0
|-
| 44 ||  || 1900 || 18½ || 
|-
| 45 ||  || 1902 || 16½ || 223.5
|-
| 46 ||  || 1900 || 16½ || 221.0
|-
| 47 ||  || 1900 || 15½ || 
|-
| 48 ||  || 1900 || 5½ || 
|-
| 49 ||  || 1900 || 2½ || 
|}

Individual medals

 Performance rating:  Nona Gaprindashvili 2877
 Board 1:  Tatjana Lematschko 9½ / 11 = 86.4%
 Board 2:  Faridah Karim 7 / 8 = 87.5%
 Board 3:  Nona Gaprindashvili 10 / 10 = 100.0%
 Reserve:  Gabriela Stanciu-Olărașu 7 / 9 = 77.8%

References

27th Chess Olympiad: Dubai 1986 OlimpBase

27
Women's Chess Olympiads
Olympiad 27
Chess Olympiad 27
Olympiad 27
Chess Olympiad 27
20th century in Dubai